Tuggelin (Tug) Yourgrau is an American playwright and TV producer.  He is the President of Powderhouse Productions in Somerville, Massachusetts.

Early life and education
Yourgrau was born in South Africa and moved to America at the age of 10. He graduated from Denver South High School, then from Swarthmore College with a degree in philosophy, and received a master's in history from Boston University.

Career
After periods of odd jobs, he became a producer at WGBH-TV where he met Joel Olicker. Together they formed their TV production company, Powderhouse Productions.

Works

Film
Thy Kingdom Come... Thy Will Be Done (1988)- Associate Producer

Television
Southie Rules (2013)_ Executive Producer
Red, White & New (2013)- Executive Producer
Cats 101 (2012)- Executive Producer
Must Love Cats (2012)- Executive Producer
Pets 101 (2012)- Executive Producer
America's Cutest Pet (2012)- Executive Producer
America's Cutest Cat (2011)- Executive Producer
Dogs 101 (2011)- Executive Producer
America's Cutest Dog (2011)- Executive Producer
America's Cutest Dog (2010)- Executive Producer
Dogs vs. Cats (2010)- Executive Producer
Magnificent Voyage of Christopher Columbus (2008)- Voice
Build it Bigger (2007)- Executive Producer
Engineering the Impossible (2002)- Consultant
Secrets, Lies and Atomic Spies (2002)- Producer, Director, Writer
Inside the U.S Mint (2000)- Director, Narrator, Producer
Killer's Trail (2000)- Consultant
Mummies: The Real Story (1999)- Producer, Director
Machine That Changed the World (1992)- Narrator
Discovering Psychology (1991)- Producer
Living Against the Odds (1991)- Writer, Producer, Director

Honors and awards
For his play The Song of Jacob Zulu, he was nominated for 1993 Tony Awards in two categories, as the author of the play and as lyricist for the award for best score of a musical.

References

See also
Independent Lens: "Filmmaker Bios", accessed Dec. 29, 2009

Living people
Year of birth missing (living people)